Saint Martin's GAC Desertmartin is a Gaelic Athletic Association club based in Desertmartin, County Londonderry, Northern Ireland. The club is a member of Derry GAA and currently caters for Gaelic football and Ladies' Gaelic football.

The club has won the Derry Senior Football Championship once in its history and appeared in four finals. Underage teams up to U-12s play in South Derry league and championships, the U-14 team and upwards compete in All-Derry competitions.

Gaelic football
Desertmartin fields Gaelic football teams at U8, U10, U12, U14, U16, Minor, U21, Reserve and Senior levels. The Senior team competes in the Derry Intermediate Football Championship and Division 2 of the Derry ACFL.

Notable players
Patsy Breen, Martin Kelly, Colm Breen, Liam Bradly, Kelan Meharg, Ian meharg

Notable Duos
Paddy O'Connor, Shea O'Connor (The Conyers)

Ladies' Gaelic football
The club also has a number of Ladies' Gaelic football groups which range from under 12's to Seniors. The Seniors reached the Derry Junior Final 2008.

History
There is a history of the Gaelic Athletic Association in Desertmartin stretching back to June 1885, where Gaelic games were played in the townland of Tirgan. In 1933 Master McLaughlin, a teacher from Derry City proposed a club be founded. It was decided the club's name should be St. Martins and the club played in yellow with a green shamrock. One of the club's first successes came in 1945 when they won the Derry Football League.

It was in 1938 that Camogie began in Desertmartin, with the formation of three teams; St. Bridget's, Brackagh and Tirgan. These teams amalgamated into St. Mary's in 1959, which went on to win the South Derry League in 1961. However camogie went out of existence in the late 1960s before re-forming in 1977, and again going out of existence in the early 1980s.

The 1950s were a successful period for the club. Among honours they won the 1950 Derry Junior Football Championship, beating Kilrea in the South Derry final before beating Coleraine in the All-Derry decider. They went on to win the Ulster title that year. The club's greatest honour came three years later when it won the 1953 Derry Senior Football Championship, beating Ballerin in the final. St Martin's reached the final again in 1959, but lost out to Bellaghy. In 1960 the club purchased their current playing field in the townland of Longfield. After falling from the Senior ranks, Desertmartin won the Derry Junior Championship for a second time in 1968. The club entered Scór for the first time in 1971 and have had some successes.

The then GAA President Paddy Buggy opened the club's new Gaelic Centre in 1984, the GAA's centenary year. The 1990s saw more development around the new Gaelic Centre in Longfield with the opening of a new re-furbished pitch and the opening of the John O'Hagan memorial stand.

On the field, the senior team had an up and down spell, during which time them won the Division 2 league on 3 occasions, and adding 4 Intermediate Reserve Championships during this time. 1993 also seen the Minor team lift the South Derry Minor Championship, beating Newbridge in the final. In 2002 Desertmartin lifted both the South Derry 'B' and All-Derry B Minor Championships. They have also lifted the South Derry 'B' championship in 2004 and the Derry League in 2007.

Senior
 Derry Senior Football Championship: 1
 1953, Runner-up 1951, 1952, 1959
 Derry Junior Football Championship: 4
 1950, 1968, 2020, 2021
 South Derry Junior Football Championship: 2
 1950, 1968
 Derry Senior Football League Division 2: 3
????, ????, ????

Under-21
 South Derry Under-21 Football Championship: 1
 2009

Reserves
Derry Intermediate Reserve Football Championship: 8
????, ????, ????, ????, 2005, 2006, 2008, 2009

Minor
 Derry Minor B2 Football Championship 1
 2015
Derry Minor Football League: 4
1945, 1946, 1956, 1981
Tommy O'Neill Cup (Derry Minor 'B' Football Championship) 1
2002
Derry Minor 'B' Football League: 1
2007
South Derry Minor 'B' Football Championship: 3
1993, 2002, 2004

Under-16
South Derry Under-16 'C' Football Championship: 1
2003
South Derry Under-16 'B' Football Championship: 1
2004

Under-14
 South Derry Under-14 'B' Football Championship: 2
 2003, 2006
 South Derry Under-14 'B' Football League: 2
 2003, 2004
 Ulster Under-14 Feile C:
 2003
 Derry Under-14 'B' Feile: 2
2009, 2017

Note: The above lists may be incomplete. Please add any other honours you know of.

See also
Derry Intermediate Football Championship
List of Gaelic games clubs in Derry

External links
St. Martin's GAC website

References

Gaelic games clubs in County Londonderry
Gaelic football clubs in County Londonderry
Gaelic Athletic Association clubs established in 1933